Ondřej  [ˈondr̝ɛj] is a Czech given name, similar to English Andrew.
 Ondřej Bank (born 1980), Czech alpine skier
 Ondřej Buchtela (1999–2020), Czech ice hockey player
 Ondřej Čelůstka (born 1989), Czech footballer
 Ondřej Cverna (born 1990), Czech footballer
 Ondřej Fiala (born 1987), Czech ice hockey player
 Ondřej Havelka (born 1954), Czech singer
 Ondřej Hejma (born 1951), Czech singer
 Ondřej Herzán (born 1981), Czech footballer
 Ondřej Hotárek (born 1984), Czech skater
 Ondřej Hutník (born 1983), Czech kick boxer
 Ondřej Hyman (born 1986), Czech luger
 Ondřej Kraják (born 1991), Czech footballer
 Ondřej Kratěna (born 1977), Czech ice hockey player
 Ondřej Kučera (born 1987), Czech footballer
 Ondřej Kúdela (born 1987), Czech footballer
 Ondřej Kušnír (born 1984), Czech footballer
 Ondřej Liška (born 1977), Czech politician
 Ondřej Mazuch (born 1989), Czech footballer
 Ondřej Murín (born 1991), Czech footballer
 Ondřej Moravec (born 1984), Czech biathlete
 Ondřej Neff (born 1945), Czech science fiction writer
 Ondřej Němec (born 1984), Czech ice hockey player
 Ondřej Palát (born 1991), Czech ice hockey player 
 Ondřej Pála (born 1984), Czech boxer
 Ondřej Pavelec (born 1987), Czech ice hockey player
 Ondřej Poživil (born 1987), Czech ice hockey player
 Ondřej Pukl (died 1936), Czech Olympic athlete
 Ondřej Raab (born 1973), Czech slalom canoeist
 Ondřej Roman (born 1989), Czech ice hockey player
 Ondřej Sehnal (born 1997), Czech basketball player
 Ondřej Sekora (1899–1967), Czech painter
 Ondřej Šiml (born 1986), Czech footballer
 Ondřej Smetana (footballer) (born 1982), Czech footballer
 Ondřej Smetana (racing driver), Czech racing driver
 Ondřej Sokol (born 1971), Czech film director
 Ondřej Sosenka (born 1975), Czech professional cyclist
 Ondřej Soukup (born 1951), Czech music composer
 Ondřej Šourek (born 1983), Czech footballer
 Ondřej Starosta (born 1979), Czech basketball player
 Ondřej Štěpánek (born 1979), Czech slalom canoeist
 Ondřej Synek (born 1982), Czech rower
 Ondřej Trojan (born 1959), Czech film producer
 Ondřej Vaculík (born 1986), Czech ski jumper
 Ondřej Vaněk (born 1990), Czech footballer
 Ondřej Veselý (born 1977), Czech ice hockey player
 Ondřej Vetchý (born 1962), Czech actor
 Ondřej Vošta (born 1968), Czech ice hockey player
 Ondřej Vrzal (born 1987), Czech footballer
 Ondřej Zetek (born 1971), Czech ice hockey player

Czech masculine given names